The Eider (Latin: Egdor or Eidora) is the longest river in the German state of Schleswig-Holstein. The river starts near Bordesholm and reaches the southwestern outskirts of Kiel on the shores of the Baltic Sea, but flows to the west, ending in the North Sea. The lower part of the Eider was used as part of the Eider Canal until that canal was replaced by the modern Kiel Canal.

In the Early Middle Ages the river is believed to have been the border between the related Germanic tribes, the Jutes and the Angles, who along with the neighboring Saxons crossed the North Sea from this region during this period and settled in England. During the High Middle Ages the Eider was the border between the Saxons and the Danes, as reported by Adam of Bremen in 1076.  For centuries it divided Denmark and the Holy Roman Empire.  Today it is the border between Schleswig, Holstein and Eiderland, the northern and southern parts, respectively, of the modern German state of Schleswig-Holstein.

The Eider flows through the following towns: Bordesholm, Kiel, Rendsburg, Friedrichstadt and Tönning. Near Tönning it flows into the North Sea. The estuary has tidal flats and brackish water. The mouth of the river is crossed by a closeable storm surge barrier, the Eider Barrage.

Navigation
A tidal lock provides access for boats through the Eider Barrage. At Friedrichstadt a lock gives access to the River Treene.

A further  beyond Lexfähre is the junction with the short Gieselau Canal, which provides a navigable link to the Kiel Canal at Oldenbüttel. The Eider therefore provides an alternative route from the North Sea to the Kiel Canal, avoiding the tides of the estuary of the Elbe.

Although it is adjacent to the Kiel Canal, through passage is no longer possible.

See also 
 Eider-Treene Depression
 List of rivers of Schleswig-Holstein

References

 
 
Rivers of Schleswig-Holstein
Holstein
Federal waterways in Germany
Kiel Canal
Rivers of Germany